Vitebskiy Kurier is a Russian language newspaper published in Vitebsk, Belarus.

At the end of August 2020, by order of the Ministry of Information of the Republic of Belarus, access to the website of the publication http://vkurier.by/ in the country was restricted due to coverage of the 2020 Belarusian protests by the website.

References

Censorship in Belarus

Literature 
Витебский курьер М // Беларуская энцыклапедыя: У 18 т. / Рэдкал.: Г. П. Пашкоў і інш.. — Мн.: БелЭн, 1997. — Т. 4: Варанецкі — Гальфстрым. — С. 202. — 480 с. —  (т. 4), .
Russian-language newspapers published in Belarus
Free Media Awards winners